John Thomas Ashworth (27 February 1850 – 20 October 1901) was an English first-class cricketer. He was a middle-order batsman and played two first-class matches for Lancashire. A regular player for both the Rochdale and Castleton clubs, Ashworth made his County debut against Kent on 3 August 1871. He was selected for Lancashire again two years later, playing in the loss to Yorkshire.

References

1850 births
1901 deaths
People from Haslingden
English cricketers
Lancashire cricketers